Prasophyllum favonium, commonly known as the western leek orchid, is a species of orchid endemic to Tasmania. It has a single tubular leaf with a reddish base and between five and fifteen brownish flowers with a dark purple labellum. In 2000, the entire population was estimated to be less than forty mature plants in a very small area.

Description
As with others in the genus, the flowers are inverted so that the labellum is above the column rather than below it. Flowering occurs in October and November.

Taxonomy and naming
Prasophyllum favonium was first formally described in 1998 by David Jones and the description was published in Australian Orchid Research. The specific epithet (favonium) is a Latin word meaning "west wind", referring to the cold westerly winds which occur frequently in this orchid's habitat.

Distribution and habitat
The western leek orchid grows among shrubs in windswept, dense low heathland. It is found in five small areas in the Arthur-Pieman Conservation Area.

Conservation
Prasophyllum favonium is classified as Endangered under the Tasmanian Threatened Species Protection Act 1995 and as Critically Endangered under the Commonwealth Government Environment Protection and Biodiversity Conservation Act 1999 (EPBC) Act. The main threats to the species are land clearing, digging by animals, inappropriate fire regimes and trampling by grazing animals.

References

External links 
 

favonium
Endemic flora of Tasmania
Endemic orchids of Australia
Plants described in 1998